Areia may refer to:
Areia (trilobite)
Areia, Paraíba, a city in Brazil
Aria (satrapy), or Greek Areía, the Greek name form of a satrapy of the Achaemenid Empire in today's Afghanistan
Athena Areia, as an epithet of the goddess Athena
Aphrodite Areia, an epithet of the goddess Aphrodite
Artemis Areia, as an epithet of the goddess Artemis
 Areia, in Greek mythology a daughter of Cleochus, by whom Apollo became the father of Miletus.